Netflix is an American global internet streaming on-demand media provider that distributes a number of content called "originals" (films, series, miniseries, etc.) along with acquired content. This article gives a list of originals produced or distributed by Netflix India. Netflix's first originals for India was Love per Square Foot and Sacred Games (both released on 2018).

TV shows

Scripted

Unscripted

Docuseries

Reality

Kids & family

Co-productions

Continuations

Films

Feature films

Documentaries

Interactive special

Stand-up comedy specials

Specials

Series/collections

Exclusive international distribution

TV shows

Films

See also
List of Amazon India originals
List of Hotstar original films
List of Disney+ Hotstar original programming
List of SonyLIV original programming
List of ZEE5 original programming

References

External links
 Netflix Originals current list on Netflix (based on geolocation)

 
Netflix
Netflix
 
 
 India originals
 India originals
Internet-related lists
India originals